Abrosovo is a rural locality (a village) in Pskovsky District, Pskov Oblast, Russia. The population was 10 as of 2010.

Geography 
Abrosovo is located 9 km northeast of Pskov (the district's administrative centre) by road. Golubovo is the nearest rural locality.

References 

Rural localities in Pskov Oblast